The 2014 South American Trampoline Championships were held in Cochabamba, Bolivia, December 12–14, 2014. The competition was organized by the Bolivian Gymnastics Federation and approved by the International Gymnastics Federation.

Medalists

References

2014 in gymnastics
Trampoline,2014
International gymnastics competitions hosted by Bolivia
2014 in Bolivian sport